Karuppu Roja  is a 1996 Tamil-language horror film directed by Paneer, scripted by Aabavanan and produced by Ayngaran International. The film stars Ramki, Amar Siddique, Yosika, Vinita amongst others. The project became the first DTS film in Indian cinema, and had a music score composed by M. S. V. Raja, his First music composing venture. The movie was Hit and successfully ran in more theaters in Tamil Nadu and also in the nearby state of Andhra Pradesh.

Plot
Vinodh (Amar Siddique) and Thulasi (Yosika) meet in college and fall in love with each other. He manipulates her into marrying him. Then he takes away her firstborn to kill as an offering to please Satan in order to cure his mentally ill mother who has been insane since the death of her husband. But Aravindh (Ramki), a kind exorcist who exorcises the ghosts in the Hindus by chanting Manthras, saves the child by praying Lord Shiva, and Thulasi is also rescued by him finally. Vinodh dies at the former's hands for spreading Satanism.

Cast 
 Ramki as Vijay
 Amar Siddique as Vinod (voice dubbed by actor Vikram)
 Yosika as Thulasi
 Vineetha as Meena
 Dubbing Janaki as Thulasi's mother
 S.R. Veeraraghavan as Thulasi's father
 Charle
 Srikanth
 Karikalan
 Kavithashree
 Kokila Gobinathan
 Sangeetha Balan
 magic rathika

Production
Karuppu Roja was written and scripted by Aabavanan, who rose to fame after writing the 1986 horror film Oomai Vizhigal. It was produced jointly by writer Indhumathi and by Karunamoorthy, who made his debut as a producer in the Tamil film industry with his studio Ayngaran International. The film was heavily publicized before releases, with the producers targeting magazines in particular to rave about the new sound system that the venture was introducing.

Release
Kalki wrote . H. Sridhar won the Tamil Nadu State Film Award for Best Audiographer, while D. Rajan won the Tamil Nadu State Film Award for Best Art Director.

Soundtrack 
The soundtrack of the film was composed by M. S. V. Raja, was well received by the audience.

References 

1996 films
Fiction about mind control
1990s Tamil-language films
Indian thriller drama films
1996 horror films
1990s thriller drama films
Films about magic
Indian fantasy adventure films
1990s fantasy adventure films
1990s horror thriller films
Indian horror thriller films
Indian horror drama films
1990s masala films
1996 drama films
Indian dark fantasy films